Bisa may refer to:
Bisã language
Bissa language
a dialect of Lala-Bisa language